Catocala carissima, the carissima underwing,  is a moth of the family Erebidae. The species can be found from Florida through Georgia to Texas.

It was formerly considered to be a subspecies of Catocala cara.

References

External links
 Catocala cara carissima info

carissima
Moths described in 1880
Moths of North America